"Luka" is a song written and performed by American singer-songwriter Suzanne Vega, released as the second single from her second studio album, Solitude Standing (1987), in May 1987. It remains her highest-charting hit in the United States, reaching  3 on the Billboard Hot 100. Worldwide, the song charted the highest in Sweden, peaking at No. 2, and reached the top 10 in Austria, Canada, New Zealand, and South Africa. Shawn Colvin sings background vocals on the record.

"Luka" earned Vega nominations at the 1988 Grammy Awards, including Record of the Year, Song of the Year and Best Female Pop Vocal Performance.  Vega also recorded a Spanish-language version of the song, included on the single release.

Subject
The song deals with the issue of child abuse. On a 1987 Swedish television special, Vega revealed her inspiration for Luka:

In a Dutch video documentary by "Top 2000 à gogo" in December 2018, Vega spoke about the meaning of the song:

Music video
The accompanying music video for "Luka" was directed by Michael Patterson and Candice Reckinge. It was shot over three days in New York City. The part of Luka was played by actor Jason Cerbone (who years later played Jackie Aprile Jr. on the series The Sopranos), who was chosen after the directors auditioned more than 90 children for the part.

Charts

Weekly charts

Year-end charts

Follow-up
During a 2012 episode of BBC Radio 4's Mastertapes, Vega revealed that she had written a follow-up to "Luka", from the point of view of the character as he looked back on his life. The song, titled "Song of the Stoic", later appeared on her eighth studio album Tales from the Realm of the Queen of Pentacles (2014).

References

External links
 
 

1987 songs
1987 singles
1989 singles
Suzanne Vega songs
MTV Video Music Award for Best Female Video
Songs about child abuse
Songs about domestic violence
A&M Records singles
Rock ballads
1980s ballads
American folk rock songs
Folk ballads